The Nakajima E8N was a Japanese ship-borne, catapult-launched, reconnaissance seaplane of the Second Sino-Japanese War. It was a single-engine, two-seat biplane with a central main-float and underwing outriggers. During the Pacific War, it was known to the Allies by the reporting name "Dave".

Design and development
The E8N was developed as a replacement for the same company's E4N and was essentially an evolutionary development of the earlier reconnaissance seaplane, with revised wings of lesser area and taller tail surfaces. Seven prototypes were constructed, under the company designation MS, first flying in March 1934. These were duly engaged in comparative trials against competitors from Aichi and Kawanishi.

Operational history
The MS was ordered into production, designated Navy Type 95 Reconnaissance Seaplane Model 1 in October 1935. A total of 755 E8Ns were built by Nakajima and Kawanishi, production continuing until 1940. It was subsequently shipped aboard all the capital ships then in service, 16 cruisers and five seaplane tenders.

It was used successfully in the Second Sino-Japanese War not only for reconnaissance, but also for dive-bombing and artillery spotting.

One E8N was purchased in early 1941 by the German Naval Attache to Japan, Vice-Admiral Paul Wenneker, and dispatched on board the KM Münsterland to rendezvous with the German auxiliary cruiser Orion at Maug Island in the Marianas.  The meeting occurred on the 1st of February, 1941, and Orion thus became the only German naval vessel of the Second World War to employ a Japanese float plane.

Some aircraft remained in service with the fleet at the outbreak of the Pacific War, and one flew reconnaissance from the battleship  Haruna during the Battle of Midway, but they were soon replaced by more modern aircraft such as the Aichi E13A and the Mitsubishi F1M, being reassigned to second-line duties.

Variants
E8N1
Initial production type, powered by 433 kW (580 hp) Nakajima Kotobuki 2 Kai 1 radial engine.
E8N2
Improved production type, with more powerful (470 kW/630 hp) Nakajima Kotobuki Kai 2 engine.

Operators

Imperial Japanese Navy Air Service

Royal Thai Navy 

Kriegsmarine
Auxiliary cruiser Orion

Specifications (E8N2)

See also

References

Francillon, R.J. Japanese Aircraft of the Pacific War. London:Putnam, 1970. .

Floatplanes
Biplanes
E08N, Nakajima
E08N
Single-engined tractor aircraft
Aircraft first flown in 1934